It Walks By Night, first published in 1930, is the first detective novel by John Dickson Carr which features for the first time Carr's series detective Henri Bencolin. This novel is a mystery of the type known as a whodunit.

Synopsis
A closely guarded room in a Paris gambling house, a mangled body on the floor, a severed head staring from the centre of the carpet.. someone had entered that room, killed and escaped all within ten minutes.

Ten minutes after the Duc de Saligny entered the card room, the police burst in – and found he had been murdered. Both doors to the card room had been watched yet the murderer had gone in and out without being seen by anyone.

1930 American novels
Novels by John Dickson Carr
American detective novels
Locked-room mysteries
Harper & Brothers books